Warped Tour 1998 was the 4th edition of the Vans Warped Tour. Four concerts were held in Canada, with the rest in United States locations. After the North American tour ended, Warped Tour traveled overseas for the first time, with a modified lineup appearing in Europe, Australia and Japan. The previous edition had a European leg.

The tour featured four stages – two main and two side – and included a "World Warped Stage" sponsored by ASCAP/ Ernie Ball that showcased local bands. The band lineups and running orders on the stages differed between dates. The tour headliners included Bad Religion, Cherry Poppin' Daddies, Deftones, NOFX, Rancid, Reverend Horton Heat, and The Specials. A 2011 Warped Tour retrospective article in the Dallas Observer deemed the 1998 lineup one of the four best ever Warped Tour lineups in its 17-year history up to that point. Other attractions featured on the tour included skateboarding demonstrations by pros such as Steve Caballero, Neal Hendrix, Andy Macdonald, Mike Frazier, and Jen O'Brien. A tour documentary, Punk Rock Summer Camp, was released on VHS in 1999 and on DVD in 2003.

The July 18 concert in Somerset, Wisconsin at Float Rite Park was merged with the heavy metal festival Ozzfest for the first and only time, resulting in a 12-hour, six-stage, 48-band event called "Ozz Gets Warped" with attendance first reported as 60,000 and later as 39,000.

Bands

22 Jacks
311
All
Amazing Royal Crowns
Anthrophobia
The Aquabats
Atomic Fireballs
Bad Religion
Blink 182
Cherry Poppin' Daddies
CIV
Deftones
Dropkick Murphys
Fu Manchu
Full on the Mouth
The Get Up Kids
Godsmack
Hatebreed
Hepcat
Home Grown
Hi-Standard
H2O
Incubus
Kid Rock
Latex Generation
L.E.S. Stitches
Mad Caddies
MxPx
NOFX
No Use For A Name
Pietasters
Rancid
Reverend Horton Heat
Royal Crown Revue
Save Ferris
Skavoovie and the Epitones
The Slackers
The Smooths
Snapcase
The Specials
Staind
Symposium
Swingin' Utters
Tilt
The Urge
Unsane
Unwritten Law
U.S. Bombs
Voodoo Glowskulls
The Vandals
Zebrahead

Tour dates

References 

1998 concert tours
Warped Tours